Penna is a rural residential locality in the local government area (LGA) of Sorell in the South-east LGA region of Tasmania. The 2016 census has a population of 422 for the state suburb of Penna.

History 
An early farm in the area was named "Pennar", and this is the most likely source of the name. Others have been suggested, including an Aboriginal word for either "man" or "man and wife". Penna was gazetted as a locality in 1972.

Frogmore Post Office opened on 30 October 1914. It was renamed "Penna" next month and closed in 1955.

Geography
The waters of Pitt Water, an inlet of Frederick Henry Bay, form the south-western boundary and parts of the western and south-eastern.

Road infrastructure 
Route C351 (Brinktop Road) enters from the north-west and runs through to the east, where it exits.

References

Localities of Sorell Council
Towns in Tasmania